Isphanyar M. Bhandara (born 18 November 1970 ) is a Pakistani politician who was a member of the National Assembly of Pakistan from June 2013 to May 2018. He was also a member of the Manifesto Committee Pakistan Muslim League-N as an Expert on Minorities Rights in Pakistan. He was born in Murree Brewery State situated on Ayub National Park Road Rawalpindi. He got his MBA Administration Degree from USA.

Family 
Isphanyar M. Bandhara is son of late M.P. Bhandhara.

Isphanyar M. Bandhara is grandson of late Peshton Bandhara.

He belonged to the small Gujarati-speaking Zoroastrian community.

Political career

He was elected to the National Assembly of Pakistan as a candidate of Pakistan Muslim League (N) on a seat reserved for minorities in the 2013 Pakistani general election. He was Member Of Manifesto Commission Of Pakistan Muslim League (N) For Minorities.

Business career 
Bhandara is the Chief Executive Officer of Murree Brewery.

References

Living people
Pakistani MNAs 2013–2018
Parsi people
Pakistani Zoroastrians
Pakistan Muslim League (N) politicians
Year of birth missing (living people)
Pakistani people of Gujarati descent